The women's relay (3 × 3.07 kilometers) event at the 2011 Asian Winter Games was held on 5 February at the Almaty Biathlon and Cross-Country Ski Complex.

Schedule
All times are Almaty Time (UTC+06:00)

Results

References

External links
Official Website

Women's relay